This is a recap of the 1986 season for the Professional Bowlers Association (PBA) Tour.  It was the tour's 28th season, and consisted of 32 events. Walter Ray Williams, Jr. won his first three PBA titles on the season, and also won the player vote for the PBA Player of the Year award. This despite the fact that Steve Cook won four titles, including a major at the BPAA U.S. Open.  Newcomer Tom Crites took the title at the Toledo Trust PBA National Championship.

In winning his second career Firestone Tournament of Champions ten years after his first, Marshall Holman won the highest single prize check in PBA history to date ($50,000) and also became just the third player to top the $1 million mark in career earnings (joining Earl Anthony and Mark Roth).  The win also gave Holman his fourth career major among his 20 total titles.

Late in the season at the Brunswick Memorial World Open, George Branham III made history by becoming the first African American to win a national PBA Tour title.

Tournament schedule

References

External links
1986 Season Schedule

Professional Bowlers Association seasons
1986 in bowling